Pennsylvania State Senate District 49 includes part of Erie County. It is currently represented by Republican Dan Laughlin.

District profile
The district includes the following areas:

Erie County:

Senators

Recent election results

References

Pennsylvania Senate districts
Government of Erie County, Pennsylvania